The men's 200 metre butterfly event at the 2022 Commonwealth Games was held on 31 July at the Sandwell Aquatics Centre. The event was won by New Zealand's Lewis Clareburt, defeating South Africa's Chad le Clos, the event's reigning Commonwealth champion.

Records
Prior to this competition, the existing world, Commonwealth and Games records were as follows:

Schedule
The schedule is as follows:

All times are British Summer Time (UTC+1)

Results

Heats

Swim-off

Final

References 

Men's 200 metre butterfly
Commonwealth Games